Yeshivas Heichal HaTorah is an Orthodox Jewish yeshiva high school located in Teaneck, New Jersey. The institution owns and operates the Jewish Center of Teaneck, where it is located. Heichal is unaffiliated with Israeli yeshivas under the same name.

The school had 150 students enrolled for the 2019–20 school year.

History
Heichal HaTorah was established by Aryeh Stechler, Avi Goldenberg, and Yehuda Jacoby. The group met in the autumn of 2012 to establish a yeshiva high school that would open in the fall of 2013. Their objective was to create an institution that combines a classic yeshiva schedule to sufficiently develop students' Torah studies with a rigorous secular studies department to give them the skillset needed for college and the professional workplace.

Heichal HaTorah greeted its first class of 17 students on September 4, 2013. It graduated its first class on June 14, 2017.

In 2017, Heichal introduced a Tikvah Humanities curriculum into its general studies courses. The course, in partnership with the Tikvah Fund, an educational foundation in New York, implements a neo-classical historical and literary curriculum. In 2019, Heichal's Tikvah curriculum was the subject of a Wall Street Journal opinion article entitled "Jerusalem meets Athens in New Jersey".

Athletic program
Heichal sponsors its own varsity and junior varsity basketball and softball teams known as the Heichal Hornets. In 2018, the Heichal Hornets won the NCYI JV Basketball League championship.

Sinai Schools program
Heichal is one of a number of schools in north Jersey and NYC where Sinai Schools operates.  Sinai runs independent programs for its special needs students, who attend school at various locations in Bergen and Essex counties in New Jersey, and in Queens and the Bronx in New York. Sinai students are given specialized and personalized education, including art, music, speech, and occupational therapies.  Housed in various other educational facilities, the Sinai students are able to interact with the host school’s own students at lunch, recess and at some after school programs, as well as for the bus rides to and from school.

Leadership 
 Aryeh Stechler, rosh yeshiva
 Maccabee Avishur, academic dean and principal
 Pesach Skulnick, senior rabbinical teacher
 Daniel Schwechter, mashgiach ruchani (spiritual guidance counselor)
 Avi Epstein, dean of student life and director of admissions
 Ari Klein, director of guidance

References

External links 
 Official website
 YouTube channel

2013 in Judaism
2013 establishments in New Jersey
Educational institutions established in 2013
Jewish day schools in New Jersey
Modern Orthodox Jewish day schools in the United States
Modern Orthodox Judaism in New Jersey
Private high schools in Bergen County, New Jersey
Orthodox yeshivas in New Jersey
Teaneck, New Jersey